Eucalyptus gamophylla, commonly known as warilu, blue-leaved mallee, twin-leaf mallee, twin-leaved mallee or blue mallee, is a species of mallee that is native to Western Australia, South Australia and the Northern Territory. It usually has smooth bark, mostly only juvenile leaves arranged in opposite pairs, flower buds in groups of three, whitish flowers and cylindrical to barrel-shaped fruit that is four-sided in cross-section.

Description
It usually has smooth white, cream-coloured or brown bark that is shed in short ribbons but there is sometimes a stocking of rough, hard, stringy-fibrous bark at the base.

Flowering occurs in most months, depending on habitat and in some places follows rain.

Taxonomy and naming
Eucalyptus gamophylla was first formally described by the botanist Ferdinand von Mueller in 1878 in his book Fragmenta Phytographiae Australiae. The type specimen was collected by John Forrest from Mount Pyrten in the Hamersley Range and cited as In monte Pyrten tractus Hammersley-Range, altitudine 2,500' supra mare. The specific epithet (gamophylla) means "marriage-leaved", referring to the bases of the opposite leaves being joined.

Distribution and habitat
Warilu is found on sandplains and sand dunes and in stony spinifex country. It has a range extending from the Mid West, Pilbara and Goldfields-Esperance regions of central Western Australia, then extending east into central and southern areas of the Northern Territory and the far north of South Australia.
Species commonly associated with E. gamophylla include Triodia basedowii, Acacia ligulata, Acacia georginae, Eremophila longifolia and Eragrostis eriopoda.

Use in horticulture
When cultivated for the garden, it is bird attracting, fast growing, requires very little maintenance and can provide plenty of aromatic cut foliage for flower arrangements.

See also
List of Eucalyptus species

References

gamophylla
Flora of South Australia
Flora of the Northern Territory
Myrtales of Australia
Eucalypts of Western Australia
Plants described in 1878
Mallees (habit)
Taxa named by Ferdinand von Mueller